This page lists Japan-related articles with romanized titles beginning with the letter I. For names of people, please list by surname (i.e., "Tarō Yamada" should be listed under "Y", not "T"). Please also ignore particles (e.g. "a", "an", "the") when listing articles (i.e., "A City with No People" should be listed under "City").

I
I My Me! Strawberry Eggs!
i-mode
Indō Yoriyasu

Ia
Iaidō

Ib
Ibara, Okayama
Ibaraki Prefecture
Ibaraki, Osaka
Ibi District, Gifu
Ibigawa, Gifu
Ibo District, Hyogo
Ibogawa, Hyogo
Ibuki, Shiga
Iburi Subprefecture
Ibusuki District, Kagoshima
Ibusuki, Kagoshima

Ic
Ice Climbers
Ichi the Killer (film)
Ichi the Killer (manga)
Ichiba, Tokushima
Ichihara, Chiba
Ichijima, Hyogo
Ichikawa, Chiba
Ichikawa, Hyogo
Kon Ichikawa
Ichiki, Kagoshima
Ichinomiya, Aichi
Ichinomiya, Aichi (Mikawa)
Ichinomiya, Chiba
Ichinomiya, Hyogo (Shiso)
Ichinomiya, Hyogo (Tsuna)
Ichinomiya, Kumamoto
Ichinomiya, Yamanashi
Ichinoseki, Iwate
Yuji Ichioka
Ichishi District, Mie
Ichishi, Mie
Ichitaro
Ichiu, Tokushima
ICOCA

Id
Ide, Kyoto
Ideogram

Ie
Ie (Japanese family system)
Ie (trading houses)
Ie, Okinawa
Saburo Ienaga
Ieshima, Hyogo

If
Akira Ifukube

Ig
Iga Province
Iga, Mie
Iggy Koopa

Ih
Ihara District, Shizuoka
Ihara Saikaku
Iheya, Okinawa

Ii
Ii Naosuke
Iida, Nagano
Iidabashi, Tokyo
Iidabashi Station
Ai Iijima
Iinan District, Mie
Iinan, Mie
Iishi District, Shimane
Iitaka, Mie
Iiyama (company)
Iiyama, Nagano
Iizasa Ienao
Iizuka, Fukuoka

Ij
Ijuin, Kagoshima

Ik
Ika District, Shiga
Gendo Ikari
Shinji Ikari
Ikaruga
Ikaruga, Nara
Ikata, Ehime
Ikawa, Tokushima
Ikazaki, Ehime
Ikebana
Ikebukuro
Ikebukuro Station
Daisaku Ikeda
Hayato Ikeda
Riyoko Ikeda
Ikeda, Gifu
Ikeda, Kagawa
Ikeda, Osaka
Ikegawa, Kochi
Ikeda, Tokushima
Iki Province
Iki, Nagasaki
Ikina, Ehime
Ikoma
Ikoma District, Nara
Ikuno, Hyogo

Im
Imabari, Ehime
Imafuji Chōtatsurō
Imagawa Yoshimoto
Yuka Imai
Imaichi, Tochigi
Shohei Imamura
Imari, Saga
Imazu, Shiga
Imperial Court in Kyoto
Imperial General Headquarters
Imperial House of Japan
Imperial Japanese Army
Imperial embassies to China
Imperial Japanese Navy
Imperial Prize of the Japan Academy
Imperial Rescript on Education
Imperial University (now National Seven Universities)
Imperialism in Asia
Improvised Music from Japan

In
Ina, Nagano
Inaba Province
Inabe District, Mie
Inabu, Aichi
Hiroshi Inagaki
Inagawa, Hyogo
Inagi, Tokyo
Inami, Hyogo
Inami, Wakayama
Inari (mythology)
Inasa District, Shizuoka
Inasa, Shizuoka
Inatsuki, Fukuoka
Inazawa, Aichi
Indian National Army
Ine, Kyoto
Inez Fressage
Ingen
Initial D
Ink and wash painting
Ink brush
Innai, Ōita
Innoshima, Hiroshima
Inō Tadataka
Ino, Kōchi
Inochi
Kikuko Inoue
Takehiko Inoue
Yasushi Inoue
Input method editor
Insei
Instant noodles
Intelligent Systems
International broadcasting in Japan
International Kendo Federation
International Military Tribunal for the Far East
Interstella 5555: The 5tory of the 5ecret 5tar 5ystem
Inukai Tsuyoshi
Inukai, Ōita
Inukami District, Shiga
Inuyama, Aichi
Inuyama Castle
InuYasha
InuYasha (character)
Invasion of Astro-Monster
Inzai, Chiba

Ip
Ipponmatsu, Ehime

Ir
Irabu, Okinawa
Irem
Irezumi
Iriki, Kagoshima
Iroha
Iron Chef
Irresponsible Captain Tylor
Iruma, Saitama

Is
Isa District, Kagoshima
Isahaya, Nagasaki
Ise, Mie
Ise Province
Ise Shrine
Isehara, Kanagawa
Isen, Kagoshima
Isesaki, Gunma
Yusuke Iseya
Ishibashi Ningetsu
Tanzan Ishibashi
Ishibe, Shiga
Akira Ishida
Ishida Mitsunari
Ishigaki, Okinawa
Kazuo Ishiguro
Ishihara color test
Shintaro Ishihara
Ishii, Tokushima
Sogo Ishii
Ishikari, Hokkaidō
Ishikari Subprefecture
Ishikawa diagram
Ishikawa District, Fukushima
Ishikawa District, Ishikawa
Ishikawa Goemon
Hideo Ishikawa
Kaoru Ishikawa
Ishikawa Prefecture
Ishikawa Takuboku
Ishikawa, Fukushima
Ishikawa, Okinawa
Ishikawajima Ne-20
Ishinomaki, Miyagi
Ishioka, Ibaraki
Kanji Ishiwara
Yojiro Ishizaka
ISO/IEC 2022
ISO 3166-2:JP
Isobe, Mie
Isoroku Yamamoto's sleeping giant quote
Issei
Isshiki, Aichi
Isshin-ryū
Issun-bōshi
Isuzu

It
Itabashi, Tokyo
Itadaki Street
Itadori, Gifu
Itagaki Seishiro
Itagaki Taisuke
Tomonobu Itagaki
Itai-itai disease
Itako
Juzo Itami
Itami, Hyogo
Itano District, Tokushima
Itano, Tokushima
Itō (name)
Ito District, Wakayama
Itō Hirobumi
Ichiro Ito
Junji Ito
Noe Ito
Itō Sachio
Shunya Ito
Itō's lemma
ITOCHU
Itoda, Fukuoka
Itoigawa, Niigata
Itoman, Okinawa
Itoshima District, Fukuoka
Itsuki, Kumamoto
Itsukushima Shrine
Itsunen Shoyu
Itsuo Tsuda
Itsuwa, Kumamoto

Iw
Iwade, Wakayama
Iwagi, Ehime
Iwai, Ibaraki
Iwaki
Iwaki, Fukushima
Iwaki Province
Iwakuni, Yamaguchi
Iwakura, Aichi
Iwakura mission
Iwakura Tomomi
Iwama, Ibaraki
Iwami District, Tottori
Iwami Province
Iwami, Shimane
Iwami, Tottori
Iwamura, Gifu
Shunji Iwai
Iwamizawa, Hokkaidō
Iwanuma, Miyagi
Iwasawa theory
Iwase Province
Iwashiro Province
Iwata, Shizuoka
Iwata District, Shizuoka
Satoru Iwata
Iwataki, Kyoto
Tōru Iwatani
Iwate Prefecture
Iwato
Iwatsuki-ku, Saitama
Iwo Jima

Iy
Iyabohn
Iyo
Iyo District, Ehime
Iyo Province
Iyo, Ehime
Iyomishima, Ehime

Iz
Izanagi
Izanami
Izena, Okinawa
Izu
Izu Islands
Izu Peninsula
Izu Province
Izu, Shizuoka
Izumi
Izumi District, Kagoshima
Kyōka Izumi
Izumi Province
Izumi, Kagoshima
Izumi, Kumamoto
Izumi, Osaka
Izumi-ku, Sendai
Izumiotsu, Osaka
Izumisano, Osaka
Izumo
Izumo, Shimane
Izumo Province
Izumo Taisha
Izunagaoka, Shizuoka
Izushi District, Hyogo
Izushi, Hyogo

I